Kachchakaduge Nalin Ruwanjeewa Fernando (born 8 May 1973) is a Sri Lankan politician and Member of Parliament.

Fernando was born on 8 May 1973. He was educated at Joseph Vaz College. He has a master's degree from the University of Northampton. He has held various senior roles at state-owned organisations: Agricultural Products Marketing Authority (director), Ceylon Steel Corporation (director), Co-operative Wholesale Establishment (chairman), Lanka Sathosa (chairman), Paddy Marketing Board (director) and State Commercial (Cooperatives and Wholesale) Company (director).

Fernando was arrested by the Financial Crimes Investigation Division in April 2018, as he attempted to leave Sri Lanka, in connection with the embezzlement of Rs. 39 million of state funds in the purchase of carom and checkers boards in 2014. He was later released on bail. In October 2019 a travel ban imposed on him but it was lifted in December 2019.

Fernando contested the 2020 parliamentary election as a Sri Lanka People's Freedom Alliance electoral alliance candidate in Gampaha District and was elected to the Parliament of Sri Lanka.

References

1973 births
Alumni of the University of Northampton
Living people
Members of the 16th Parliament of Sri Lanka
Prisoners and detainees of Sri Lanka
Sinhalese politicians
Sri Lankan prisoners and detainees
Sri Lankan Roman Catholics
Sri Lanka People's Freedom Alliance politicians
Sri Lanka Podujana Peramuna politicians